Richard Mills (16 February 1798 – 25 January 1882) was an English professional cricketer who played first-class cricket between 1825 and 1843, primarily for teams in Kent. He was considered one of the best professional cricketers of his era.

Mills was born at Pump Farm, Benenden in Kent in 1798. He made his first-class debut in 1825 for a Kent side against one from Sussex at Brighton, going on to play a total a total of 47 first-class matches. A left-handed batsman and left arm medium pace roundarm bowler, Mills played mainly for Kent sides, including one match for the newly formed Kent County Cricket Club in 1843 at Hemsted Park near his home in Benenden. He played six times for the Players in the Gentlemen v Players series, four times for England sides and for the South in the North v. South series.

Mills was considered one of the strongest professionals in the country. Benenden produced a number of fine cricketers and, in 1836, Mills played with fellow Kent and Benenden man Ned Wenman against a full side of 11 players from the Isle of Oxney on the border between Kent and Sussex. Mills and Wenman won the match which had been organised as a wager. The event is recorded on the Benenden village sign.

Mills came from a cricketing family which on at least one occasion is reported to have played as a family side against Benenden. His brother, George, played occasionally for Kent sides between 1825 and 1829, making his debut in the same match as Richard. George also played in the 1831 Gentlemen v Players match, possibly a match which Richard had been invited to play in but, due to the method of addressing professionals simply by their surname, the invitation is reported to have been misunderstood.

A benefit match was played for Mills in 1861 at Swifts Park in Cranbrook. He retired to Rolvenden in Kent where he died in 1882 aged 83.

Notes

References

External links

1798 births
1882 deaths
English cricketers
English cricketers of 1787 to 1825
English cricketers of 1826 to 1863
Kent cricketers
Players cricketers
North v South cricketers
People from Rolvenden
Left-Handed v Right-Handed cricketers
Gentlemen of Kent cricketers
People from Benenden